William "Bill" Kettner (November 20, 1864 – November 11, 1930) was a US Democratic politician from San Diego, California. He served four terms in Congress from 1913 through 1921 and is credited with bringing many U.S. Navy facilities to San Diego.

Biography 
Kettner was born in 1864 in Ann Arbor, Michigan to John F. and Frederika Kettner, both German immigrants. His parents moved to St. Paul, Minnesota in 1873.  His father died when he was 13, so he had to leave school to work, first as a bell boy, then he drove a dray horse. He came to San Diego when he was 21, in the middle of an economic boom in the late 1880s, and worked various odd jobs around the state.

In 1893 he married Ida B. Griffs in Visalia, California and went into the real estate and insurance business there.  The couple divorced in 1904.

Kettner married Marion Morgan in 1905, and they lived in Visalia until moving to San Diego in 1907.  William Kettner set up an insurance business, and later became involved with real estate and banking. The next year the city was visited by the U.S. Navy's Great White Fleet - its first U.S. stop on a round-the-world cruise. Kettner was inspired by the visit and volunteered to organize the city's reception festivities for the fleet. He then became a member of the board of the San Diego Chamber of Commerce, and served as its director.

Kettner was first elected to the House of Representatives in 1912. Although he was a Democrat and Republicans had traditionally represented the district, he was supported by many Republicans, including the conservative San Diego Union, because of his popularity with the Chamber of Commerce and the turmoil in the national Republican party caused by Theodore Roosevelt's split of the party into "stand-patters" and Progressives. Republicans used the slogan "Why not Kettner?" Kettner won by 3,500 votes. He was re-elected in 1914 by 24,000 votes; in 1916 by 9,000 votes; and in 1918 when he ran unopposed. He stepped down as congressman in 1920 due to poor health and a financial downturn with his insurance business.

During his four terms in Congress, 1913–1921, he spent much effort bringing Naval bases to San Diego.  His first accomplishment, achieved by lobbying even before he was sworn in as a member of Congress, was a federal appropriation to dredge San Diego Bay to allow large ships to enter. He continued to promote San Diego and Southern California interests (the Congressional district then encompassed ten counties) throughout his tenure.

Kettner won friends easily with his warm personality and addressed colleagues as "brother", earning him the nickname of "Brother Bill" in San Diego and Washington.  He courted many congressmen and officials, lobbying them over dinner and gifting them with California produce such as oranges and wine. He became friends with Franklin D. Roosevelt, then Assistant Secretary of the Navy.  Roosevelt visited San Diego during the
1915 Panama-California Exposition and came away impressed with the area's potential as a Navy base.  He helped Kettner's efforts to establish bases in San Diego as assistant Naval secretary and later as President.

By the time Kettner retired from Congress in 1921, he had secured many Naval bases, including Camp Kearny on the site which is now Marine Corps Air Station Miramar, the Broadway Naval Supply Depot, the 32nd Street Naval Station, San Diego Naval Hospital, Naval Training Center San Diego, and Naval Air Station North Island. The military later became for a time the largest employer in San Diego County.  Kettner was nicknamed the "Million Dollar Congressman" for his ability to gain Naval bases in San Diego.

Kettner died in San Diego in 1930 and is buried at Greenwood Memorial Park, beside his mother, who died in 1912.  In 1919 the fireboat Bill Kettner, in use until 1961, was named in his honor.  In 1930, San Diego's Arctic Street was renamed Kettner Boulevard to honor him.

Quote

Notes

Other references 
 . Compiled by Mary B. Steyle. Kettner's Congressional autobiography, with his portrait.
 ,  v. 2, pp. 104–105: "William Kettner"
  Biography, pp. 106–108
 Biography (San Diego Historical Society)
 
 "William Kettner: San Diego's Dynamic Congressman", The Journal of San Diego History 25:3 (Summer 1979) by Lucille C. DuVall

1864 births
1930 deaths
History of San Diego
Businesspeople from San Diego
Politicians from San Diego
Politicians from Ann Arbor, Michigan
Politicians from Saint Paul, Minnesota
People from Visalia, California
American bankers
American businesspeople in insurance
American real estate businesspeople
American people of German descent
California city council members
Democratic Party members of the United States House of Representatives from California
Burials at Greenwood Memorial Park (San Diego)